Privates on Parade: A Play with Songs in Two Acts is a 1977 farce by English playwright Peter Nichols (book and lyrics), with music by Denis King.

Plot
The play is set around the activities and exploits of the fictional Song and Dance Unit South East Asia (SADUSEA), a British military concert party stationed in Singapore and Malaya in the late 1940s during the Malayan Emergency. The drama draws upon Nichols' own experiences in the real-life Combined Services Entertainment, the postwar successor to ENSA, Entertainments National Service Association.  The play is noteworthy, inter alia, for a series of musical numbers, performed by the male lead, parodying the style of such performers as Noël Coward, Marlene Dietrich and Carmen Miranda.

Productions
It was premiered at Stratford by the Royal Shakespeare Company, before receiving its London première at the Aldwych Theatre on 17 February 1977, where it ran for 208 performances.  This production won the 1977 Laurence Olivier Award for Best New Comedy.

It was revived in 1979 at the Derby Playhouse and at York Theatre Royal, and again in 1982 with Bruce Payne as Flight Sergeant Kevin Cartwright and Tim Barlow; another revival was produced in 1989. A 2001 revival directed by Michael Grandage at the Donmar Warehouse had a cast including Roger Allam, James McAvoy, Malcolm Sinclair and Indira Varma, set design by Christopher Oram and choreography by Scarlett Mackmin.  Allam received the 2002 Laurence Olivier Award for Best Actor for his performance.

In 2012 it was staged at the Noël Coward Theatre in London as the opening production of the first season of work from the newly formed Michael Grandage Company, with Simon Russell Beale in the lead.

Original cast
Charles Bishop - Tim Wylton
Cheng - Richard Rees
Corporal Len Bonny - Joe Melia
Eric Young-Love - Simon Jones
Kevin Cartwright - Ben Cross
Lee - 	John Venning
Major Giles Flack - Nigel Hawthorne
Reg Drummond - David Daker
Steven Flowers - Ian Gelder
Sylvia Morgan - Emma Williams
Terri Dennis - Denis Quilley

Film adaptation

The play was adapted by Nichols and Handmade Films for a 1982 film with John Cleese and Denis Quilley, directed by Michael Blakemore.

Awards and nominations 
Awards
 1977 Laurence Olivier Award for Best New Comedy
 1990 New York Drama Critics' Circle Award Best Foreign Play
 1990 Drama Desk Award for Outstanding Featured Actor in a Play: Simon Jones

References

Further reading

External links
 

1977 plays
1977 musicals
Comedy plays
LGBT-related plays
Laurence Olivier Award-winning plays
New York Drama Critics' Circle Award winners
Off-Broadway plays
British plays adapted into films
Plays by Peter Nichols
West End plays